The Tetrapediini are a tribe of apid bees.

Genera
Coelioxoides
Tetrapedia

References
C. D. Michener (2000) The Bees of the World, Johns Hopkins University Press.

Apinae
Bee tribes